The 2001 BMW Open was a men's tennis tournament played on outdoor clay courts in Munich, Germany and was part of the International Series of the 2001 ATP Tour. The tournament ran from 30 April through 6 May 2001. Unseeded Jiří Novák won the singles title.

Finals

Singles

 Jiří Novák defeated  Antony Dupuis 6–4, 7–5
 It was Novák's 2nd title of the year and the 17th of his career.

Doubles

 Petr Luxa /  Radek Štěpánek defeated  Jaime Oncins /  Daniel Orsanic 5–7, 6–2, 7–6(7–5)
 It was Luxa's only title of the year and the 1st of his career. It was Štěpánek's 2nd title of the year and the 3rd of his career.

References

External links
 Official website 
 Official website 
 ATP tournament profile

 
BMW Open
Bavarian International Tennis Championships